La Portera is a village in Valencia, Spain. It is part of the municipality of Requena.

References

Towns in Spain
Populated places in the Province of Valencia
Requena-Utiel